Stephan Moccio is a Canadian composer, producer, pianist, arranger, conductor and recording artist.   He co-wrote and co-produced the two end credit songs for Fifty Shades of Grey and its soundtrack: "Earned It" (The Weeknd) and "I Know You" (Skylar Grey), with the former being nominated for Best R&B Song and Best Song Written For Visual Media at the 58th Annual Grammy Awards, and Best Original Song at the 88th Academy Awards. He also was a producer on the Weeknd's album Beauty Behind the Madness, which was nominated for Album Of The Year at the 58th Annual Grammy Awards.

Moccio co-wrote Celine Dion's hit "A New Day Has Come" with Aldo Nova, which reached and held the number one spot on the Billboard AC Chart for a record-breaking 21 weeks. He also co-wrote Miley Cyrus' single "Wrecking Ball" from her 2013 studio album Bangerz. For the Vancouver 2010 Winter Olympics, Moccio co-wrote the theme song “I Believe” performed by Nikki Yanofsky.

He has collaborated with a diverse roster of artists including, Avril Lavigne, Seal, Dua Lipa, Ellie Goulding, Shaffer "Ne-Yo" Smith, James Blunt, Jason Derulo, Jamie Cullum, BeBe Winans, Jon Bellion, Paloma Faith, Jordan Smith, Fergie, Boi-1da, as a songwriter, musician and producer.

Early life 
Stephan Moccio was born to an Italian-Canadian father and a French-Canadian mother. Moccio is fluent in English and French. Growing up in Niagara Falls, Moccio began his piano studies at the age of 3. His musical style and vocabulary are influenced by the musical genres of classical, jazz, pop, hip hop, blues, and dance.

Career 
Moccio enrolled at the University of Western Ontario where he studied performance and classical piano studies under instructors John Paul Bracey and Jack Behrens. After completing a Bachelor of Arts degree in composition and piano performance in 1994, he was accepted into Berklee College of Music. However, he chose to focus on developing his professional career and instead signed a publishing deal with Sony/ATV Music Publishing. During the early years of his tenure at Sony/ATV, Moccio worked as a session musician, in-house producer, arranger and composer, attending rehearsals of the Toronto Symphony Orchestra, and playing in Toronto jazz clubs and hotel lounges, notably the Four Seasons Hotel's La Serre.

Throughout his nearly 9-year tenure at Sony/ATV, Moccio wrote for several award-winning Canadian and international artists, most notably Celine Dion, Sarah Brightman, and Josh Groban. Moccio spent many months in writing sessions in Nashville, Los Angeles, and New York during these years, which culminated in a lengthy catalogue of songs as musician, songwriter, producer and composer.

It was in 1996 that Moccio's special relationship with television programs began. TV themes he has written, performed and produced include ETalk, Marilyn Dennis Show, W5, Your Morning and for Rogers Sportsnet Central, Hockey Central, and Toronto Blue Jays on Sportsnet.

In 2001, Moccio began work on a melody that would become the chart-topping single "A New Day Has Come" recorded by Celine Dion, released on her album (in both a radio mix version and 3/4 time ballad album version), of the same name in February 2002. The song broke records at the time by maintaining the #1 position on the U.S. Hot Adult Contemporary charts for 21 weeks. The single would make it onto numerous compilation CDs and DVDs in North America. In 2003, Celine Dion titled her live residency Las Vegas show A New Day....

In 2003, Moccio left Sony/ATV Music Publishing Canada to work predominantly under his own publishing company, Sing Little Penguin. He soon moved into his state-of-the-art recording studio in downtown Toronto, where he continued to write, record, produce for both his solo projects and various collaborations with recording artists.

In 2008 Moccio teamed up with songwriter Alan Frew (Glass Tiger) to write "I Believe", the theme song of CTV's and Rogers Media's Canada's Olympic Broadcast Media Consortium for the Vancouver 2010 Olympic Winter Games. On March 1, 2010, "I Believe", covered by Nikki Yanofsky, reached 4 x Platinum status (CRIA) in digital sales (over 160,000 digital units sold) in Canada. The same version achieved #1 status on iTunes Canada and Billboard's Canadian Hot 100 for 4 straight weeks in February 2010.

In February 2010, Moccio signed a Worldwide Publishing deal with Universal Music Publishing Group.

In 2012, Moccio was one of the judges of the Canadian reality show, Canada's Got Talent. The show was later cancelled after one season but was revived in 2022.

In August 2013, Moccio moved to Los Angeles and currently works out of his record studio in Santa Monica.

In June 2019, Moccio was honoured by the University of Western Ontario with a Doctor of Music, honoris causa (DMus) degree.

In November 2019, Moccio signed a worldwide record deal with Decca Records.

Moccio is a Yamaha Artist and performs exclusively on Yamaha Pianos.

His album Lionheart was a Juno Award nominee for Instrumental Album of the Year at the Juno Awards of 2023.

Selected discography

As composer, songwriter or producer

As recording artist

References

General references
Canada's National Art Centre Stephan Moccio in Concert
Hope and Cope Foundation Soiree Fantastique 
Stephan Moccio's Profile on Artist Direct

 

[ Billboard Canadian Hot 100]
Stephan Moccio at Sugarcain Entertainment

Stephan Moccio at Songwriter Universe

External links
Official site

Canadian composers
Canadian male composers
Canadian songwriters
Living people
1972 births
University of Western Ontario alumni
Musicians from St. Catharines
Canada's Got Talent judges
Sportsnet
Canadian people of Italian descent